Woodmore Elementary School may refer to:
 Woodmore Elementary School, Chattanooga, Tennessee - Hamilton County Schools
 Woodmore Elementary School, Woodmore census-designated place (Mitchellville postal address), Prince George's County, Maryland - Prince George's County Public Schools